Tim Thomas is an American retired ice hockey defenseman who was an All-American for Wisconsin and won a Liiga championship in 1987.

Career
Thomas was a member of Bob Johnson's final recruiting class and began playing at Wisconsin a year after the team won their third NCAA championship. The Badgers were still a powerful team in Thomas' first season, winning the WCHA Tournament and returning to the national championship game, only to conference rival North Dakota. Thomas had played well that season and was invited to participate at the 1982 World Junior Ice Hockey Championships. Team USA finished in 6th, a typical result for the team. The next season began shaping up even better for Thomas. Wisconsin looked ready to compete for a championship again while he spent time as both a forward and defenseman. Thomas played in his second WJC and, though he wasn't able to help them finish in the medals, Thomas led the US National team in scoring. His stellar play earned him an invite to the National Team for the upcoming World Championships and he remained with the national team for the remainder of the year. Thomas helped the US win pool-B with an undefeated record and a promotion to the top bracket for the subsequent world championship.

With Wisconsin having won a National Championship in his absence, Thomas remained with Team USA for the next season as they prepared for the 1984 Winter Olympics. He played through the entire season with the program and was even included on the Olympic roster, but he didn't play in any of the games. After a disappointing 7th-place finish, Thomas left the national team and returned to Wisconsin. The team had fallen off the pace after making three consecutive championship games and was now playing just well enough to not make tournament appearances. Upon his return, Thomas produced a monster offensive season, leading the team with 50 assists and finishing second at 63 points. He led all defensemen in the nation in scoring and was named an All-American. After Wisconsin was eliminated from the playoffs, he rejoined the US national team one final time at the World Championships, helping the team to a 4th-place finish.

In his senior season, Thomas's numbers slipped a bit but he was still able to help Wisconsin to a 27-win season. The team, however, was swept in the conference semifinals and missed out on another NCAA tournament. Immediately after the season was over, Thomas began his professional career and played the rest of the season with the Indianapolis Checkers. Despite posting good numbers, he ended up playing the next season in Finland. He joined reigning league champion Tappara and helped the club repeat with their 6th championship.

He was back in North America the following season but ended up playing just 10 games for the Baltimore Skipjacks. He headed back to Europe in 1988 and played a year with Diables Noirs de Tours. After sitting out for a few seasons, Thomas ended his playing career with the Nijmegen Tigers in 1992.

Statistics

Regular season and playoffs

International

Awards and honors

References

External links

1963 births
Living people
Ice hockey players from Minnesota
People from Richfield, Minnesota
American men's ice hockey defensemen
Wisconsin Badgers men's ice hockey players
AHCA Division I men's ice hockey All-Americans
Indianapolis Checkers players
Tappara players
Baltimore Skipjacks players
Diables Noirs de Tours players
Nijmegen Tigers players